The John Horman Trophy is awarded annually to the Executive of the Year in the Quebec Major Junior Hockey League.

Winners

External links
 QMJHL official site List of trophy winners.

Quebec Major Junior Hockey League trophies and awards